Song Chang-Ho (born 20 February 1986) is a South Korea football player who currently plays for Busan IPark as a midfielder.

Club career 

Song started his professional career with the Pohang Steelers, as a draft player from Dong-A University. A regular squad member, he made most of his appearances for the club from the bench as a substitute.  As well as intermittent appearances in the Korean domestic competitions, Song has also played in both the 2009 and 2010 editions of the FIFA Club Championship as well as the Asian Champions League.

On 29 November 2010, Song transferred to Daegu FC in a swap deal, with Lee Seul-Ki moving to Pohang.

Club career statistics

References

External links 

1986 births
Living people
South Korean footballers
Pohang Steelers players
Daegu FC players
Jeonnam Dragons players
Ansan Mugunghwa FC players
Busan IPark players
K League 1 players
K League 2 players
Association football midfielders